Paul Emmanuel may refer to:

 Emmanuel Paulker (born 1955), Nigerian politician
 Paul Emmanuel (artist) (born 1969), South African artist